Much in Common is an album by bassist Ray Brown and vibraphonist Milt Jackson recorded in 1964 and released on the Verve label.

Reception
The Allmusic review by Michael G. Nastos awarded the album 3½ stars, describing "two jazz giants in the prime of their careers, playing music not readily identifiable aside from their work with Oscar Peterson (Brown) or MJQ (Jackson) around this time".

Track listing
All compositions by Ray Brown except as indicated
 "Much in Common" - 3:54 
 "When the Saints Go Marching In" (Traditional) - 3:58 
 "I'm Going to Live the Life I Sing About in My Song" (Thomas A. Dorsey) - 4:21 
 "Gravy Blues" - 3:31 
 "Swing Low, Sweet Chariot" (Traditional) - 2:47 
 "What Kind of Fool Am I?" (Leslie Bricusse, Anthony Newley) - 4:07 
 "Sometimes I Feel Like a Motherless Child" (Traditional) - 3:38 
 "Just for a Thrill" (Lil Hardin Armstrong, Don Raye) - 4:02 
 "Nancy (With the Laughing Face)" (Phil Silvers, Jimmy Van Heusen) - 3:37 
 "Give Me That Old Time Religion" (Traditional) - 2:00 
Recorded at A&R Studios in New York City on January 13 (tracks 1–3, 5, 7 & 10)  & January 14 (tracks 4, 6, 8 & 9), 1964

Personnel
Milt Jackson – vibes
Ray Brown - bass
Kenny Burrell - guitar
Wild Bill Davis - organ (tracks 1–3, 5, 7 & 10)
Hank Jones - piano (tracks 4, 6, 8 & 9) 
Albert Heath - drums
Marion Williams - vocals (tracks 1–3, 5, 7 & 10)

References 

Verve Records albums
Milt Jackson albums
Ray Brown (musician) albums
1964 albums